Pituophis catenifer affinis, commonly known as the Sonoran gopher snake, is a nonvenomous subspecies of colubrid snake that is endemic to the southwestern United States. It is one of six recognized subspecies of the gopher snake, Pituophis catenifer.

Geographic range

It is found from central Texas across the Southwestern United States to southeastern California, Arizona, and south into the northern states of Mexico.

Description
Adults average  in total length.

The saddle-shaped dorsal blotches are reddish brown, except for near and on the tail, where they are dark brown or blackish.

The rostral is about as long as it is broad, not elongated as in other Pituophis subspecies.

Habitat
It primarily inhabits the Sonoran Desert ecosystem of the Southwest USA, and into northern Mexico.

Diet
They feed on small rodents, hence the common name gopher snake.

Behavior
They are moderately defensive but can be tamed, and become very gentle. They have hard tough skin on their noses used to burrow into gopher holes and the burrows of other rodents. During the winter they brumate. They invade gopher holes and holes of other burrowing rodents and eat what they need to stay alive in the invaded burrow.

Reproduction
P. c. affinis is oviparous. Adult females lay 7-22 eggs in July or August. The eggs average .

References

Further reading
 Hallowell, E. 1852. Descriptions of new Species of Reptiles inhabiting North America. Proc. Acad. Nat. Sci. Philadelphia 6: 177–182. (Pityophis affinis, p. 181.)

External links
Wildlifenorthamerica.com: Fact Sheet for the Sonoran Gopher Snake (Pituophis catenifer affinis)

catenifer affinis
Snakes of North America
Reptiles of Mexico
Reptiles of the United States
Fauna of Northern Mexico
Fauna of the Southwestern United States
Fauna of the Sonoran Desert
Fauna of the Colorado Desert
Taxa named by Edward Hallowell (herpetologist)